Events in 1941 in animation.

Events

January
 January 4: Chuck Jones' Elmer's Pet Rabbit premieres, produced by Warner Bros. Cartoons and starring Bugs Bunny and Elmer Fudd.

February
 February 27: 13th Academy Awards
 The Milky Way, directed by Rudolf Ising, produced by MGM Animation, wins the Academy Award for Best Animated Short Film. It is the first animated cartoon not produced by Disney to win an Oscar.
 Pinocchio, produced by the Walt Disney Animation Studios, wins the Academy Award for Best Original Score, while When You Wish Upon a Star wins the Academy Award for Best Original Song.

March
 March 15: Tex Avery's Tortoise Beats Hare premieres, produced by Warner Bros. Cartoons. It marks the first time that Bugs Bunny loses, Cecil Turtle makes his debut.
 March 28: Scrub Me Mama with a Boogie Beat, directed and produced by Walter Lantz Productions, is first released.

April
 April 11: The Fleischer Studios release an adaptation of Johnny Gruelle's children's stories, Raggedy Ann and Raggedy Andy.
 April 19: Tex Avery's Porky's Preview premieres, produced by Warner Bros. Animation, starring Porky Pig.

May
 May 24: Tex Avery's Hollywood Steps Out, produced by Warner Bros. Cartoons, is first released. It features caricatures of Hollywood stars.
 May 29: Disney animators' strike: At the Walt Disney Animation Studios a five-week strike breaks out to ask for higher payment and privileges. While the demands are eventually met, several animators are either fired by Disney or quit.

June
 June 11: Jack King's Early to Bed, starring Donald Duck, directed by Jack King, produced by Walt Disney Animation Studios premieres.
 June 20:
 The Reluctant Dragon, a live-action film with animated scenes by Jack Cutting, Ub Iwerks, Hamilton Luske and Jack Kinney, produced by Walt Disney Animation, premieres. It features three shorts within the feature film, Baby Weems, How To Ride a Horse starring Goofy, and The Reluctant Dragon.
 Riley Thomson's The Nifty Nineties premieres, produced by Walt Disney Animation Studios, starring Mickey Mouse and Minnie Mouse.

July
 July 5: Tex Avery's The Heckling Hare, produced by Warner Bros. Cartoons, starring Bugs Bunny, is first released.
 July 7: With Woody Woodpecker, Woody Woodpecker's second film appearance, produced by Walter Lantz, the bird becomes star of his own long-running animated series.
July 19: William Hanna and Joseph Barbera direct The Midnight Snack, produced by MGM. This is the second cartoon to star Tom and Jerry and the first in which they are officially named.

August
 August 11: The Screwdriver, produced by Walter Lantz, is released, being the last Woody Woodpecker cartoon featuring Mel Blanc as Woody's voice.  Afterwards Warner Bros. Cartoons takes an exclusivity contract on Blanc's voice.
 August 30: Bob Clampett's The Henpecked Duck is first released, starring Daffy Duck, produced by Warner Bros. Cartoons.

September
 September 13: Tex Avery's All This and Rabbit Stew, starring Bugs Bunny, produced by Warner Bros. Cartoons, premieres. Its the final cartoon for Warners directed by Avery and his final cartoon starring Bugs. Avery leaves Warner Brothers and joins MGM Animation instead.
 September 26: Paramount Pictures launches an animated film series based on Superman, produced by Fleischer Studios, which kicks off with the first film Superman.

October
 October 3: Lend a Paw, starring Pluto, directed by Clyde Geronimi, produced by the Walt Disney Studios, is first released.
 October 23: Ben Sharpsteen, Norman Ferguson, Wilfred Jackson, Bill Roberts, Jack Kinney and Samuel Armstrong's Dumbo, produced by Walt Disney Animation Studios, is first released. It becomes a surprise box office hit, helping Disney win back some of their financial losses caused by World War II cutting off their European market.

November
 November 14: Jack Kinney's Goofy cartoon The Art of Skiing, produced by Walt Disney Animation Studios, premieres. This also marks the debut of the Goofy holler sound effect, provided by Hannes Schroll.
 November 19: 
 In China Wan Guchan and Wan Laiming release Princess Iron Fan, the first Chinese animated feature film.
 The National Film Board of Canada releases The Thrifty Pig, a cartoon by the Walt Disney Studios about the importance of war bonds.
 November 24: Pantry Panic starring Woody Woodpecker, directed and produced by Walter Lantz, premieres.

December
 December 5: 
The Fleischer Studios release their second animated feature film Mr. Bug Goes to Town which becomes such a colossal flop that the studio goes bankrupt.
The Color Rhapsody The Fox and the Grapes, produced by Screen Gems and directed by Frank Tashlin, is first released and marks the debut of the Fox and the Crow.
 December 6: Friz Freleng's Rhapsody in Rivets, produced by Warner Bros. Cartoons, premieres.
 December 12: The National Film Board of Canada releases Richard Lyford's 7 Wise Dwarfs, produced by the Walt Disney Animation studios, to educate audiences on war bonds.
 December 20: Tex Avery's Wabbit Twouble, starring Bugs Bunny, produced by Warner Bros. Cartoons, premieres. Avery directed the short, but after he left the studio Bob Clampett finished the picture.
 December 26: Jack Kinney's Goofy cartoon The Art of Self Defense, produced by the Walt Disney Animation Studios, premieres.

Specific date unknown
 Roberto Sgrilli creates the animated short Il Barone di Münchhausen.

Films released

 January 1 - Princess Iron Fan (China)
 July 21 - The Reluctant Dragon (United States)
 October 23 - Dumbo (United States)
 December 5 - Mr. Bug Goes to Town (United States)

Births

January
 January 5: Hayao Miyazaki, Japanese animator, director, producer, screenwriter, author and manga artist (co-founder of Studio Ghibli).
 January 8:
 Graham Chapman, English actor and comedian (occasional voices in Terry Gilliam's animated shorts in Monty Python's Flying Circus and the film spin-offs), (d. 1989).
 Star Wirth, American xerographer (Hanna-Barbera, The Pagemaster, Warner Bros. Animation), (d. 2012).
 January 11: Motosuke Takahashi, Japanese film director, animator, character designer and storyboard artist (Tatsunoko Productions, Studio Pierrot), (d. 2007).
 January 12: Long John Baldry, English-Canadian singer and voice actor (voice of Dr. Robotnik in Adventures of Sonic the Hedgehog, Mistle Toad in Toad Patrol, Komplex in Bucky O'Hare and the Toad Wars), (d. 2005).
 January 22: Rintaro, Japanese director (Galaxy Express 999, Metropolis).
 January 24: Gary K. Wolf, American author (Who Framed Roger Rabbit).
 January 31:
 Gerald McDermott, American film director, children's book writer and illustrator, (d. 2012).
 Jessica Walter, American actress (voice of Ashley Walker-Club-Dupree in The Magic School Bus, Demoness in The Life and Times of Juniper Lee, Old One in The Land Before Time, Malory Archer in Archer, Mrs. Wyatt in Scooby-Doo! Mystery Incorporated, Tabitha in Turbo: F.A.S.T., Miss Heinous in Star vs. the Forces of Evil, Granny Goodness in Harley Quinn, Athena in the Justice League Action episode "The Trouble With Truth"), (d. 2021).

March
 March 5: Errol Le Cain, English children's book illustrator and animator (worked for Richard Williams), (d. 1989).
 March 23: Zsolt Richly, Hungarian animator (Pannonia Film Studio, A Kockásfülű nyúl), (d. 2020).
 March 24: David Fox, Canadian actor (voice of Captain Haddock in The Adventures of Tintin, Sentinels and Master Mold in X-Men), (d. 2021).
 March 28:
 Charles Swenson, American animator (Twice Upon a Time, Teenage Mutant Ninja Turtles, Rugrats, Mike, Lu & Og).
 Alf Clausen, American composer (The Simpsons, The Critic).
 March 29: John W. Hyde, American producer (Mighty Mouse: The New Adventures, Film Roman, Harriet the Spy).
 March 30: Graeme Edge,  English musician, songwriter and poet (voiced himself in The Simpsons episode "Viva Ned Flanders"), (d. 2021).

April
 April 2: Dr. Demento, American radio broadcaster and record collector (voiced himself in the Bobby's World episode "Bobby's Big Boo-Boo", and The Simpsons episode "Sideshow Bob Roberts").
 April 7: Danny Wells, Canadian actor (voice of Bush and Raul in Heathcliff, Luigi in The Super Mario Bros. Super Show!, King Hugo III in Potatoes and Dragons, Gus in Willa's Wild Life), (d. 2013).
 April 13: Arvo Nuut, Estonian film operator and film producer (Tallinnfilm, Nukufilm), (d. 2021).
 April 18: Phillip Young, American animator (Walt Disney Animation Studios, Sinbad: Legend of the Seven Seas, Looney Tunes: Back in Action), (d. 2021).
 April 28: 
 Ann-Margret, Swedish-American actress, singer, and dancer (voice of Ann-Margrock in The Flintstones episode "Ann-Margrock Presents").
 Mike Renzi, American composer, music director, pianist and jazz musician (Sesame Street), (d. 2021).

May
 May 4:
 Jannik Hastrup, Danish writer, director, producer, illustrator and animator (Benny's Bathtub, Samson & Sally, War of the Birds).
 John Kimball, American animator (Raggedy Ann & Andy: A Musical Adventure, A Special Valentine with the Family Circus, Ruby-Spears Enterprises, Heidi's Song, directed the main titles for Teacher's Pet), storyboard artist (Darkwing Duck, Gargoyles), sheet timer (Disney Television Animation) and director (Ruby-Spears Enterprises, Hanna-Barbera, Disney Television Animation, ChalkZone).
 May 6: William Moritz, American animation film historian, (d. 2004).
 May 13: Dwi Koendoro, Indonesian comics artist, animator (made an animated series based on his comics series Legenda Sawung Kampret) and film producer (head of Indonesian Animation Association), (d. 2019). 
 May 18: Miriam Margolyes, English-Australian actress (portrayed Aunt Sponge in James and the Giant Peach, voice of the Matchmaker in Mulan, Mrs. Plithiver in Legend of the Guardians: The Owls of Ga'Hoole, Queen Oofeefa in Early Man, Shirley Finster in Rugrats, Giraffe and Squirrel in Tinga Tinga Tales, Nana in Nina Needs to Go!, Bessie in the 101 Dalmatian Street episode "A Summer to Remember").
 May 23: Nicole Jaffe, Canadian actress (original voice of Velma Dinkley in Scooby-Doo).
 May 24: Larry Leichliter, American animator (Bill Melendez Productions, Rock-A-Doodle, A Troll in Central Park), storyboard artist (Hey Arnold!), character designer (Aladdin), sheet timer (Nickelodeon Animation Studio, Cartoon Network Studios, Baby Looney Tunes, Danger Rangers, Gravity Falls, Bee and PuppyCat, Go! Cartoons), animatic editor (Party Wagon), overseas supervisor (You're in the Super Bowl, Charlie Brown, CatDog), producer (ChalkZone) and director (Spider-Man, Nickelodeon Animation Studio, Cartoon Network Studios, Peanuts specials, Sofia the First, Bee and PuppyCat).
 May 31: Nicole Van Goethem, Belgian cartoonist, animator and film director (A Greek Tragedy), (d. 2000).

June
 June 2:
 Jeff Winkless, American voice actor (d. 2006).
 Stacy Keach, American actor (voice of the Phantasm and Carl Beaumont in Batman: Mask of the Phantasm, Robert Vance in the Batman Beyond episode "Lost Soul", Roland De Fleures in The Zeta Project episode "The Next Gen").
 June 4: Jackie Banks, American animation checker and scene planner (Hanna-Barbera, This Is America, Charlie Brown, The Simpsons, Tom and Jerry: The Movie), (d. 1995).
 June 15: Neal Adams, American comic book artist (DC Comics) and writer (Bucky O'Hare and the Toad Wars), (d. 2022).
 June 19: Linda Dangcil, American actress (voice of Carmen Alonso / Raya in Jem, Homeless Woman in the Static Shock episode "Frozen Out", additional voices in A Pup Named Scooby-Doo), (d. 2009).
 June 21: Joe Flaherty, American actor, comedian (portrayed Count Floyd in "The Count Floyd Show" segment of The Completely Mental Misadventures of Ed Grimley, voice of Lawyer and General in Heavy Metal, Big Dracula in Little Dracula, Hooft in The Legend of Tarzan, Snorkel in The Santa Claus Brothers, Cloaked Skull in Teamo Supremo, Jeb the Goat in Home on the Range, Western Union Man and Vatican Messenger in Family Guy, Frank and Security Guard in The Life & Times of Tim, Abe's Foster Dad in Clone High) and television writer (Scooby-Doo! Mystery Incorporated).

July
 July 5: Terry Cashman, American record producer and singer-songwriter (performed the song "Talkin' Softball" in The Simpsons episode "Homer at the Bat").
 July 9: Hisayuki Toriumi, Japanese animator (Tatsunoko Production, Sunrise, Studio Pierrot), film director and producer (Science Ninja Team Gatchaman), screenwriter and novelist, (d. 2009).
 July 10: Ian Whitcomb, English entertainer, singer-songwriter, composer (Bugs Bunny: Superstar), record producer, writer, broadcaster and actor (voice of the Narrator in A Christmas Carol), (d. 2020).
 July 13:  Robert Forster, American actor (voice of Major Forsberg in Todd McFarlane's Spawn, The President in Justice League Unlimited, Jack J. Kurtzman in Teenage Mutant Ninja Turtles, Jack Chapman and Police Officer in the Godzilla: The Series episode "Wedding Bells Blew", Lucky Jim in The Simpsons episode "Sex, Pies and Idiot Scrapes", General Bryce in the Transformers: Prime episode "Grill"), (d. 2019).
 July 28: 
 Dianne Jackson, English film director (The Snowman), (d. 1992).
 Peter Cullen, Canadian voice actor (voice of Optimus Prime in the Transformers franchise, Eeyore in the Winnie the Pooh franchise, Murky Dismal in Rainbow Brite, Venger in Dungeons & Dragons, Hulk, Red Skull, and Mysterio in Spider-Man and His Amazing Friends, Mario in the Donkey Kong segment of Saturday Supercade, Captain Slaughter in Pound Puppies, Bankjob Beagle and Admiral Grimitz in DuckTales, narrator in Voltron: Defender of the Universe, announcer for Toonami, original voice of Monterey Jack in Chip 'n Dale: Rescue Rangers).
 July 29: David Warner, English actor (voice of Ra's al Ghul in the DC Animated Universe, the Lobe in Freakazoid! and the Teen Titans Go! episode "Huggbees", the Master Control Program in Tron, Rob/Dr. Wrecker in The Amazing World of Gumball, Alpha in Men in Black: The Series, Victor Frankenstein in Toonsylvania, Lord Angstrom in Buzz Lightyear of Star Command, Nergal in Grim & Evil, Duke Richard of Lionsgate, Krasus, Sir Morgan and Maldon's Commander in The Legend of Prince Valiant, Herbert Landon and Red Skull in Spider-Man, Archmage in Gargoyles, Old Man and Oldsy in What's New, Scooby-Doo?, Talon in the Mighty Max episode "Souls of Talon", Zarm in the Captain Planet and the Planeteers episode "The Dream Machine", Ice Breaker in the Biker Mice from Mars episode "Below the Horizon", the Glyph in the Captain Simian & the Space Monkeys episode "Rhesus Pieces", Arthur Dearborn in the Iron Man episode "Cell of Iron", narrator in Pooh's Grand Adventure: The Search for Christopher Robin and A Valentine for You), (d. 2022).
 July 30: Paul Anka, Canadian-American singer, songwriter, and actor (voiced himself in The Simpsons episode "Treehouse of Horror VI").

August
 August 4:
 Martin Jarvis, English actor and producer (voice of Saitine in Wreck-It Ralph, Alfred Pennyworth in Batman: Assault on Arkham, continued voice of Nergal in The Grim Adventures of Billy & Mandy).
 Richard Trueblood, American animator (Hanna-Barbera, The Nine Lives of Fritz the Cat, The Mouse and His Child, A Family Circus Christmas, Filmation), storyboard artist (Maxie's World, Goof Troop, Sonic the Hedgehog, Bonkers), sheet timer (Little Nemo: Adventures in Slumberland, Disney Television Animation, DuckTales the Movie: Treasure of the Lost Lamp, Animaniacs, DIC Entertainment, The Incredible Hulk, Adelaide Productions, All Dogs Go to Heaven: The Series, Histeria!, The Secret of NIMH 2: Timmy to the Rescue, The Wild Thornberrys, The New Woody Woodpecker Show, The Oblongs, Courage the Cowardly Dog, Clifford's Really Big Movie), producer (Attack of the Killer Tomatoes, Space Cats, Bonkers, Fantastic Four) and director (Filmation, Garbage Pail Kids, Teenage Mutant Ninja Turtles, Disney Television Animation, Biker Mice from Mars, Iron Man, The Incredible Hulk, Dexter's Laboratory), (d. 2019).
 August 8: Earl Boen, American actor (voice of Red Skull and the Beyonder in Spider-Man, Santa Claus in A Pinky and the Brain Christmas, Leonard Kanifky in Bonkers, Rhino in Batman: The Animated Series, Simon Stagg in the Justice League episode "Metamorphosis", William Howard Taft in the Time Squad episode "White House Weirdness", continued voice of Senor Senior Sr. in Kim Possible), (d. 2023).
 August 14: David Crosby, American singer, guitarist, and songwriter (voiced himself in The Simpsons episodes "Marge in Chains" and "Homer's Barbershop Quartet"), (d. 2023).
 August 16: Paul Hecht, English-born Canadian actor (voice of the title character in Johnny Cypher in Dimension Zero, Army Veterinarian in My Dog Tulip, additional voices in Courage the Cowardly Dog).
 August 25: Dan Hennessey, Canadian actor (voice of Father Bear in Little Bear, Braveheart Lion in the Care Bears franchise, Bully Koopa in The Adventures of Super Mario Bros. 3 and Super Mario World, The Commissioner in The Adventures of Sam & Max: Freelance Police, Sir Hotbreath in Blazing Dragons, Ruckus in X-Men: The Animated Series, Turbo Tu-Tone in COPS, Genghis Rex in Dinosaucers, Dizzy in Rock & Rule).
 August 29: Robin Leach, English entertainment reporter and writer (voice of TV Host in the Garfield and Friends episode "Fat and Furry", Chamberlain in the Happily Ever After: Fairy Tales for Every Child episode "The Empress' Nightingale", himself in the Family Guy episode "Peter, Peter, Caviar Eater"), (d. 2018).

September
 September 10: Stephen Jay Gould, American paleontologist, evolutionary biologist and science historian (voiced himself in The Simpsons episode "Lisa the Skeptic"), (d. 2002).
 September 14: Yuri Norstein, Soviet and Russian animator (Hedgehog in the Fog, Tale of Tales, The Overcoat).
 September 16: David Hemblen, English-born Canadian actor (voice of Magneto in X-Men, Vault-Keeper in Tales from the Cryptkeeper, Asmodeus in Redwall, The Night Master in Yin Yang Yo!), (d. 2020).
 September 24: Linda McCartney, American photographer and activist (voiced herself in The Simpsons episode "Lisa the Vegetarian"), (d. 1998).

October
 October 9: Warren Luening, American musician and trumpeter (Walt Disney Animation Studios, The Nightmare Before Christmas, A Goofy Movie, Casper, Pixar, Space Jam, Anastasia, Family Guy, Stuart Little 2, Looney Tunes: Back in Action, The Polar Express, Ice Age: The Meltdown, The Ant Bully, Teen Titans: Trouble in Tokyo, The Simpsons Movie, Horton Hears a Who!, Shrek Forever After, Alvin and the Chipmunks: Chipwrecked, Despicable Me 2), (d. 2012).
 October 21: Marcell Jankovics, Hungarian graphic artist, film director and author (Sisyphus, The Struggle), (d. 2021).
 October 23: Mel Winkler, American actor (voice of Commissioner Henderson in Superman: The Animated Series, Lucius Fox in The New Batman Adventures, Johnny the snowman in Oswald), (d. 2020).
 October 25:
 Helen Reddy, Australian-American pop singer and actress (portrayed Nora in Pete's Dragon, voiced herself in Family Guy), (d. 2020).
 Gordon Tootoosis, Saskatchewan actor (voice of Kekata in Pocahontas, Mushom in Wapos Bay, Gordy in Open Season), (d. 2011).

November
 November 1: Robert Foxworth,American actor (voice of Professor Hamilton in Justice League Unlimited, Race Bannon in season 2 of The Real Adventures of Jonny Quest).
 November 5: Yoshiyuki Tomino, Japanese anime creator, animator, director, screenwriter, songwriter and novelist (creator of the Gundam franchise).
 November 8: Julian Antonisz, Polish film director (Sun: A Non-Camera Film 1977, aka Słońce - film bez kamery), (d. 1987).
 November 11: Russell Horton, American actor (voice of Kat's Father in Kenny the Shark, continued voice of the Trix Rabbit).
 November 12: Dave Brain, American animator (Hanna-Barbera, Marvel Productions), storyboard artist (Darkwing Duck, Space Cats, Garfield and Friends, Cow and Chicken, Family Guy), director (Film Roman, Cow and Chicken, I Am Weasel, Grim & Evil, ChalkZone, Johnny Bravo) and sheet timer (Disney Television Animation, Teenage Mutant Ninja Turtles, The Mask, Life with Louie, King of the Hill, Warner Bros. Animation, Men in Black: The Series, Jackie Chan Adventures).
 November 20: Dr. John, American singer and songwriter (voice of The Sun in Whoopi's Littleburg, performed the theme songs of Whoopi's Littleburg and Curious George), (d. 2019).
 November 22: Cilia van Dijk, Dutch film producer (Anna & Bella).
 November 23: Eduard Nazarov, Russian animator, children's book illustrator and voice actor (Once Upon a Dog), (d. 2016).
 November 24: Simon Singer, American actor (voice of Slightly in Peter Pan).
 November 28: Shannon Farnon, Canadian actress (voice of Kim Butler in Valley of the Dinosaurs, Wonder Woman in Super Friends).

December
 December 9: Beau Bridges, American actor (voice of Sheriff Scaly Briggs in Penn Zero: Part-Time Hero, Yoshio Onodera in From Up on Poppy Hill, Prince Kuramochi in The Tale of the Princess Kaguya).
 December 10: 
 Chad Stuart, English singer and actor (voice of Flaps the vulture in The Jungle Book), (d. 2020).
 Fionnula Flanagan, Irish stage, television, and film actress (voice of Granny and Macha in Song of the Sea).
 December 29: Ray Thomas, English multi-instrumentalist, flautist, singer and member of The Moody Blues (voiced himself in The Simpsons episode "Viva Ned Flanders"), (d. 2018).
Specific date unknown
 Joan C. Gratz, American artist, animator, and filmmaker (Will Vinton Productions, Mona Lisa Descending a Staircase).

Deaths

August
 August 13: J. Stuart Blackton, British animator and film director (The Enchanted Drawing, Humorous Phases of Funny Faces), dies at age 66.

October
 October 8: Win Smith, Canadian-American animator and comics artist (Penguin Pete, Looney Luke, Mickey Mouse, Looney Tunes''), dies at age 53.

See also
List of anime by release date (1939–1945)

References

External links 
Animated works of the year, listed in the IMDb